The Dame-Marie least gecko (Sphaerodactylus zygaena) is a species of lizard in the family Sphaerodactylidae. It is endemic to Haiti.

References

Sphaerodactylus
Endemic fauna of Haiti
Reptiles of Haiti
Reptiles described in 1977